Ernest Brown (born May 17, 1979 in the Bronx, New York) is an American former professional basketball player who was selected in the second round of the 2000 NBA draft by the Miami Heat. He played collegiately for the Indian Hills Community College. He played three games for them during the 2001-02 NBA season before being waived, and was also later signed and waived by the Boston Celtics; he has spent most of his career in the NBDL and other minor/foreign leagues. His final NBA game was played on April 14, 2002 in a 67 - 94 loss to the New York Knicks. In that game, Brown recorded 3 points, 4 rebounds and 1 block.

In 2007, he played in Puerto Rico for Grises de Humacao. He played 3 games in 2008 as an import for the Barangay Ginebra Kings in the Philippine Basketball Association's Fiesta Conference before being replaced by ex-NBDL standout Chris Alexander. He played high school basketball at St. Rita of Cascia High School in Chicago and St. Raymond High School for Boys in the Bronx.

External links
NBA stats @ basketballreference.com
Info at Hoopshype.com
Ernest Brown at eurobasket.com

1979 births
Living people
African-American basketball players
American expatriate basketball people in Bulgaria
American expatriate basketball people in China
American expatriate basketball people in Cyprus
American expatriate basketball people in Greece
American expatriate basketball people in Israel
American expatriate basketball people in Mexico
American expatriate basketball people in the Czech Republic
American expatriate basketball people in the Philippines
American expatriate basketball people in Turkey
American expatriate basketball people in Venezuela
American men's basketball players
Barangay Ginebra San Miguel players
Beijing Ducks players
Caciques de Humacao players
Centers (basketball)
Fayetteville Patriots players
Fenerbahçe men's basketball players
Greek Basket League players
Halcones UV Córdoba players
Hapoel Tel Aviv B.C. players
Harlem Globetrotters players
Indian Hills Warriors basketball players
Israeli Basketball Premier League players
Liaoning Flying Leopards players
Miami Heat draft picks
Miami Heat players
Mobile Revelers players
PBC Academic players
Philippine Basketball Association imports
Shanxi Loongs players
Sportspeople from the Bronx
Basketball players from New York City
21st-century African-American sportspeople
20th-century African-American sportspeople